C.M. Rajesh Gowda is an Indian radiologist and politician. He is a Member of the Karnataka Legislative Assembly from Sira. He belongs to the Bharatiya Janata Party and is one of the youngest MLAs in Karnataka as of 2020.

His father, C. P. Mudalagiriyappa was a three-time Congress MP. As a medical professional, Dr Rajesh Gowda focussed on his medical practice. His service of patients endeared him to people, who encouraged him to enter public life. He contested the 2020 bypoll election from Sira and won, becoming the first BJP candidate to win the constituency.

Dr Rajesh Gowda along with congress leader Yathindra Siddaramaiah founded Matrix Imaging Solutions. However Dr Yathindra resigned as a director following a controversy in 2016.

References 

Bharatiya Janata Party politicians from Karnataka
Indian radiologists
Living people
People from Tumkur
Kannada people
1974 births
Karnataka MLAs 2018–2023